Kapil Sibal (born 8 August 1948) is an Indian lawyer and politician. Sibal has represented several high-profile cases in the Supreme Court of India and is widely regarded as one of the famous lawyers of India. He is a Member of Parliament, in Rajya Sabha.

A University of Delhi and Harvard University graduate, Sibal has practiced law in Wall Street and held several important posts relating to law and administration including Additional Solicitor General, and President of Supreme Court Bar Association. Sibal first entered Rajya Sabha in 1998 to represent Bihar. Before that, he had unsuccessfully contested for the Lok Sabha against Sushma Swaraj. He later contested from Chandni Chowk and won in 2004 and 2009.

As a senior Indian National Congress member then, Sibal served under Prime Minister Manmohan Singh as a minister holding various portfolios over the years. As minister, he headed delegations of India in high-profile international forums. His actions in official capacity were controversial multiple times including when he undertook to regulate internet content. Sibal often was portrayed as an intellectual face of the Congress who batted for the party on television and in regular columns.

In the Supreme Court of India, he usually represented the Congress. He left the Indian National Congress in 2022 to file his nomination for the Rajya Sabha independently but backed by Samajwadi Party.

Early life and education
Sibal was born on 8 August 1948 in Jalandhar in Punjab. His family migrated to India during the partition in 1947. Kapil Sibal moved to Delhi in 1964. After his schooling from St John's High School, he joined St. Stephen's College, Delhi for his B.A. He earned his LL.B. degree from the prestigious Faculty of Law, University of Delhi, and later an M.A. in history from St. Stephen's College, Delhi. He joined the bar association in 1972. In the year 1973, he qualified for Indian Administrative Services and was offered an appointment. But he declined the offer and decided to set up his own law practice. Afterwards, he attended the Harvard Law School where he enrolled for an LL.M. which he completed in 1977. He was designated as senior lawyer in 1983.

In 1989, he was appointed the Additional Solicitor General of India. In 1994, he appeared in the Parliament as a lawyer and successfully defended V. Ramaswami during impeachment proceedings. The impeachment motion was placed in the assembly for debate and voting on 10 May 1993. Of 401 members present in the assembly that day, there were 196 votes for impeachment and no votes against and 205 abstentions by ruling Congress and its allies. He had served as the President of the Supreme Court Bar association on three occasions, i.e. 1995–1996, 1997–1998 and 2001–2002.

Career
Kapil Sibal joined the Bar association in 1972. He decided to set up his own law practice. He was designated as a Senior Lawyer in 1983. He was the Additional Solicitor General of India between 1989 and 1990, as well.

Political career
Over the years, he has held several important positions in the Government of India and the Society, such as: Additional Solicitor General of India (December 1989 – 1990); Member, Board of Management, Indira Gandhi National Open University (1993); President, Supreme Court Bar Association (1995–96, 1997–98 and 2001–2002); Member, Rajya Sabha (July 1998); Member, Executive Council, Institute of Constitutional and Parliamentary Studies (July, 2001); Member, Business Advisory Committee (August, 2001); Member, Committee on Home Affairs (January, 2002); Co-chairman, Indo-US Parliamentary Forum (2002); Member, Board of International AIDS Vaccine Initiative (2002); Member, Programme Board of the Bill & Melinda Gates Foundation's Indian AIDS initiative (2003); Member, Working Group on Arbitrary Detention set up by the Human Rights Commission, Geneva.

Member of Parliament, Lok Sabha

In the 2004 general elections, Sibal became an MP by winning the Chandni Chowk constituency against TV actor Smriti Irani of the Bharatiya Janata Party (BJP) in the National Capital Territory representing the Congress Party and was inducted into the Cabinet under Prime Minister Manmohan Singh as Union Minister for Science, Technology and Earth Sciences. He won the constituency of Chandni Chowk for the second time for the Indian National Congress in the Lok Sabha elections of 2009.

During his tenure as Telecom Minister his comment about the loss in the 2G spectrum case being only notional and causing "zero loss" created a public outcry and he had to clarify it later. Kapil Sibal was indicted by CAG for favoring M/S Phoenix Rose LLC by overlooking rules and regulations and handpicking that company for creating a database for over 500,000 working professionals of People of Indian Origin settled in the US. CAG's report said that the project's cost was $ but three years after the initiation, the company has dumped the networking site, completing just over 16% of the targeted work.

Also during his time in that office, his move to regulate internet content was criticized across many social networking sites like Facebook, Twitter and Google+.

He represented India in the Annual Meetings of the World Economic Forum in 2005 and 2009 held at Davos, Switzerland. He led the Indian delegation to the Annapolis Conference, USA, held to gather International support for establishment of a Palestinian state and the realization of Israeli–Palestinian peace during November 2007. He led the Indian delegation to the United Nations Framework Convention on Climate Change (UNFCCC) at Bali in December 2007.

Sibal approved the creation of an Indian Institute of Technology Muddenahalli as part of the 11th 5-year plan.
He is also the person who introduced the Continuous and Comprehensive Evaluation (CCE) system in India for Class IX and Class X and he has also started the changes in the IIT JEE pattern. He has laid the foundation stone for IIT Patna.

After the 2004 Indian Ocean earthquake and tsunami, Sibal announced that a fresh onslaught of deadly tsunami were likely along the India southern coast and Andaman and Nicobar Islands, even though was no sign of turbulence in the region. The announcement was a false alarm and the Home Affairs minister withdrew their announcement. Three days after the announcement, Indian National Congress president Sonia Gandhi called Science & Technology minister Kapil Sibal to express her concern about Sibal's 30 December public warning being "hogwash".

Member of Parliament, Rajya Sabha
Parliamentary Committee assignments 
 13 Sept. 2021 onwards: Member Committee on External Affairs

Independent candidate
On 25 May 2022, he filed his nomination for Rajya Sabha elections as an independent candidate with support of Samajwadi Party. Samajwadi Party chief Akhilesh Yadav had accompanied him while he filed his nominations. Subsequently, he broke to the media that he had resigned from the Indian National Congress on 16 May.

Other works
In 2011 Sibal has also announced a touchscreen tablet computer to be co-developed with private partnership. Satish Jha, chairman of OLPC India, the leading competitor to this venture, questioned his claim that a $35 laptop could be created in a year. Five state Chief Ministers endorsed the OLPC initiative and the Chief Minister of Rajasthan himself inaugurated the project on the day Sibal showcased his future laptop. The event was attended by two members of the Union Cabinet. This also lead to an open letter by Nicholas Negroponte offering him complete access to MIT and OLPC technologies to help realise India's dream to create a laptop of its own.
As of November 2012, many customers who put in orders still had not received their computers and were offered refunds.

Publications
An anthology of Kapil Sibal's poems titled I Witness: Partial Observation was published by Roli Books, New Delhi, in August 2008.

Kapil Sibal has penned down the lyrics of the songs "Tere bina" and "Mast hawa" for 2016 Hindi film Shorgul.

Personal life
Kapil Sibal's father was Hira Lall Sibal, a renowned advocate, his family migrated to India during the partition in 1947. In 1994, H.L. Sibal was named a "Living Legend of the Law" by the International Bar Association and in 2006, the Government of India honoured him with the 'Padma Bhushan' award for his distinguished services in the field of Public Affairs.
He married Nina Sibal in 1973, who died of breast cancer in 2000. Amit and Akhil, Sibal's two sons from his first marriage, are both lawyers. In 2005, Sibal married Promila Sibal. His brother is Kanwal Sibal, a retired top diplomat of the Indian Foreign Service, and a former foreign secretary of India.

References

External links

 In Conversation: Kapil Sibal, HRD Minister Business Standard
Profile at Ministry of Science and Technology, Official website
The Argumentative Indian: The precarious ambition of Kapil Sibal

|-

|-

|-

|-

|-

1948 births
India MPs 2004–2009
India MPs 2009–2014
St. Stephen's College, Delhi alumni
Faculty of Law, University of Delhi alumni
Harvard Law School alumni
20th-century Indian lawyers
Living people
Indian Senior Counsel
Lok Sabha members from Delhi
People from Jalandhar
Punjabi people
Indian National Congress politicians
Rajya Sabha members from Bihar
Senior Advocates in India
United Progressive Alliance candidates in the 2014 Indian general election
Education Ministers of India
Law Ministers of India
Members of the Cabinet of India
Rajya Sabha members from Uttar Pradesh
Supreme Court of India lawyers